Moix is a surname. Notable people with the surname include:

Ana María Moix (1947–2017), Spanish poet and novelist
Manuel Moix, Spain's top anti-corruption prosecutor, February-June 2017
Terenci Moix (1942–2003), Spanish novelist
Yann Moix (born 1968), French novelist and film director